The Church Holy Trinity, Kumanovo (Macedonian Cyrillic: Црква Света Троица, Куманово) is an Eastern Orthodox church in the city of Kumanovo, North Macedonia.

Since they were not admitted to the Church of St Nicholas, controlled by the Bulgarian Exarchate, the local Serbs decided to build a church of their own. They called for help from the Serbian government who sponsored the drawing of its blueprints, done by Russian architect Vladimir Antonov. The church was built during 1901 by Mihajlo Djordjević from Debar. The iconostas was made from a donation by Queen Draga of Serbia and featured many Serbian saints such as St Sava, Prince Lazar and St Uroš.

See also
 Kumanovo
 Macedonian Orthodox Church – Ohrid Archbishopric

Gallery

References

Churches in Kumanovo
Macedonian Orthodox churches